The Football League play-offs for the 1988–89 season were held in May 1989, with the two-legged finals taking place at the finalists home stadiums. The play-off semi-finals were also played over two legs and were contested by the teams who finished in 3rd, 4th, 5th and 6th  place in the Football League Second Division and Football League Third Division and the 4th, 5th, 6th and 7th placed teams in the Football League Fourth Division table. The winners of the semi-finals progressed through to the finals, with the winner of these matches either gaining promotion or avoiding relegation for the following season.

Background
The Football League play-offs have been held every year since 1987. They take place for each division following the conclusion of the regular season and are contested by the four clubs finishing below the automatic promotion places. For the first three seasons the final was played over two legs but this was changed to a single match at Wembley Stadium from 1990.

Second Division

Semi-finals
First leg

Second leg

Watford 1–1 Blackburn Rovers on aggregate. Blackburn Rovers won on away goals.

Crystal Palace won 2–1 on aggregate.

Final

First leg

Second leg

Crystal Palace won 4–3 on aggregate.

Third Division

Semi-finals
First leg

Second leg

Bristol Rovers won 5–0 on aggregate.

Port Vale won 4–2 on aggregate.

Final

First leg

Second leg

Port Vale won 2–1 on aggregate.

Fourth Division

Semi-finals
First leg

Second leg

Leyton Orient won 2–1 on aggregate.

Wrexham won 5–1 on aggregate.

Final

First leg

Second leg

Leyton Orient won 2–1 on aggregate.

External links
Football League website

 
English Football League play-offs